Laws (formerly, Station and Bishop Depot) is an unincorporated community in Inyo County, California.

Geography
The town is in ZIP code 93514 and area code 760. . The official elevation is  AMSL. The town is bordered by the White Mountains to the east and the Sierra Nevada Mountains, the "Eastern Sierras," to the west. It is located near the Owens River in upper Owens Valley.

History
The settlement of Station was formed in 1883 as a depot on the Carson and Colorado Railroad. The name was changed to Laws in honor of R.J. Laws, a railroad official. A post office operated at Laws from 1887 to 1963. The town of Laws was a railroad station along a  narrow gauge railway portion of the Southern Pacific Railroad.

Today the town of Laws exists as a museum of Owens Valley and Eastern Sierra Nevada history. It is registered as California Historical Landmark #953.

Laws Railroad Museum and Historic Site
In 2015, the travel website Atlas Obscura designated this museum as one of 160 "international gems."

Railroads displays 
 The Laws Railroad Museum and Historic Site includes static displays of a train consisting of an oil-fired steam locomotive, Southern Pacific 9, and several freight cars from the Southern Pacific Railroad's  narrow gauge lines. There are also operating locomotives (none of which are steam-powered) that run on the narrow gauge tracks in the museum's grounds. The museum's display explains that the railroad was relied on by many Eastern Sierra communities before modern roads were built during the 1950s and 1960s.

A station agent's home is located south of the railroad station. Docents portray the station agent on most days, helping visitors understand the period culture.

The Museum includes several historic buildings moved to the site from downtown Bishop. There is a church and school house.  A vehicle on display was a 1949 ambulance, which was later painted black, stripped of emergency lighting, and used as a hearse. Medical implements from a historic local doctor's office are on display. There is also a wooden Western Electric type 11 telephone booth.

Owens Valley history displays 
Owens Valley history, including construction and impact of the Los Angeles Aqueduct project, or "Owens Valley Aqueduct," is described in Museum displays. Today, land on all sides of the museum is property of the Los Angeles Department of Water and Power, of the City of Los Angeles. Photographs and docents show and explain that the Valley included large tracts of agricultural land; from the Paiute Native American era, through pioneer days, to the Aqueduct 'water wars era' that began diversions of water in the early 20th century to Los Angeles. A tour docent, sharing a vintage  black-and-white photograph, explained  "This is a picture of my mom's apple orchard."

Mining displays

The museum also houses an extensive collection of old and reconstructed mining equipment. Recently, museum volunteers recreated a primitive human- or animal-powered ore-crusher called an arrastra:

A new arrastra was built out of native materials, in this case an elm tree and hardware such as chains found in the museum's bone yard. An arrastra is a basic mine milling machine used to pulverize rock. A sweep arm – the elm log – is rotated and drags heavy stones over pieces of ore-rich rock to be pulverized. After many rotations, the rock breaks apart and the ore is exposed. It's heavy labor that was done by a beast of burden before mechanization.

Government

See also

Desert railroads 
Tonopah and Tidewater Railroad
Las Vegas and Tonopah Railroad
Carson and Colorado Railway
Death Valley Railroad
Borate and Daggett Railroad
Waterloo Mining Railroad
Calico and Odessa Railroad
Trona Railway
List of defunct California railroads
List of defunct Nevada railroads

Locale 
Bishop, California
California Water Wars
Cadillac Desert
Fish Slough Area of Critical Environmental Concern
Category: Geography of Inyo County, California
Inyo National Forest
Manzanar
Owens River

References

Sources 
Map: "Laws, California 7.5-minute Quadrangle," U.S. Geological Survey, 1994.
Map: "Guide to Eastern Sierra, #2463" Automobile Club of Southern California, 1996.
Map: "Inyo National Forest," U.S. Dept. of Agriculture, U.S. Forest Service, Geometronics Service Center, 1989.
 U.S. Geological Survey, National Geographic Names Database.

External links
Laws Railroad Museum and Historic Site official website

Museums in Inyo County, California
Open-air museums in California
Railroad museums in California
Owens Valley
Unincorporated communities in Inyo County, California
Populated places in the Mojave Desert
Bishop, California
California Historical Landmarks
History of the Sierra Nevada (United States)
Unincorporated communities in California